Vahto is a former municipality of Finland. It was consolidated with Rusko on January 1, 2009.

It is located in the province of Western Finland and is part of the Southwest Finland region. The municipality had a population of 1,876 (2004-12-31) and covered an area of 77.10 km² of which 0.02 km² is water. The population density was 24.34 inhabitants per km².

Vahto was one of the 18 municipalities in the Turku region, and due to its close proximity to the center of Turku (about 20 km), it may also be considered part of the Turku metropolitan area. In the north, Vahto shared a common boundary mark with seven other municipalities. This famous site, called Kuhankuono in Finnish, is also a pre-historical border mark between Southwest Finland and the other Finnish provinces.

The municipality was unilingually Finnish.

External links

https://web.archive.org/web/20050802091740/http://www.vahto.fi/ – Official site 

Former municipalities of Finland
Populated places disestablished in 2009
2009 disestablishments in Finland